Aldo Covello is an Italian physicist from the University of Naples Federico II. He was awarded the status of Fellow in the American Physical Society, after he was nominated by their Forum on International Physics in 2012, for perfecting the theory of pairing correlations, for showing that the nucleon-nucleon potential lead to predictions for nuclei far from stability, and for his outstanding contributions to the international nuclear physics community by providing, for over two decades, a venue for theorists and experimentalists to share their latest ideas.

References 

Fellows of the American Physical Society
American Physical Society
21st-century Italian physicists
Living people
Date of death missing
Year of birth missing (living people)